I Was Jack Mortimer (German: Ich war Jack Mortimer) is a 1933 thriller novel by the Austrian writer Alexander Lernet-Holenia.

In 1935 it was adapted into a German film of the same title directed by Carl Froelich and starring Anton Walbrook and Sybille Schmitz. In 1952 it was adapted into the Austrian film Adventure in Vienna directed by Emil E. Reinert and starring Gustav Fröhlich and Cornell Borchers. A separate English-language version Stolen Identity (1953) was also produced. The West German television film  (1961) was directed by Michael Kehlmann.

References

Bibliography
 Goble, Alan. The Complete Index to Literary Sources in Film. Walter de Gruyter, 1999.

1933 German-language novels
Austrian novels adapted into films
Novels by Alexander Lernet-Holenia
Austrian thriller novels